Amy Holland is singer Amy Holland's self-titled debut album. The album was released on LP record in 1980, and was produced by Amy's future husband Michael McDonald. One of the songs on the album "How Do I Survive" (a song originally sung by The Paul Bliss Band) became a big hit and made it to the Top 30 chart. Amy Holland would often perform "How Do I Survive" live on music TV shows such as Music Fair (a Japanese music show) and Young Oh! Oh!. Those live performances of the song can be found on YouTube. Holland mostly recorded some song covers for this album, with one of them being Annette Hanshaw's 1928 jazz-standard Forgetting You The success of the song How Do I Survive helped Amy earn a Grammy Nomination for Best New Artist in 1981, but she did not win the award however. Some of the songs on the album have been written by Michael McDonald such as "Here In The Light" and "Show Me the Way Home". "How Do I Survive" was a hit peaking at #22 on the Billboard Hot 100. Three years later Amy would release another studio album called On Your Every Word.

Track listing

Personnel 

Musicians
Amy Holland – main artist, lead vocals, and backing vocals on tracks A1 and A3 to B3
Hadley Hockensmith – guitar on tracks A1 to A5 and B3 to B5
Patrick Henderson – piano on tracks A1, A2, and A5 to B4, and electric piano on tracks A3, A4, and B5
Michael McDonald - backing vocals on tracks A1, A3, A4, and B1, piano on tracks A3 and B5, electric piano on tracks A1, A2, and A5 to B4, and clavinet on "I'm Wondering"
Gary Grant – trumpet on tracks: A1, A5, and B4
Ollie Mitchell – trumpet on tracks A1, A5, and B4
Plas Johnson – saxophone on tracks: A1, A5, and B4
Tom Scott – saxophone on tracks A1, A5, B3, and B4, and lyricon on "Stars"
Dick Hyde – trombone on tracks A1, A5, and B4
John Bay Pierce – bass on tracks A1, A3, A4, B3, and B5
Mike Baird – drums on tracks A1 to A5 and B3 to B5
Lenny Castro – percussion on tracks A1, A3, A4, B1, and B2
Wendy Waldman – backing vocals on "How Do I Survive"
Chet McCracken – vibraphone on tracks A2 and A4
Donald Boyette – bass on tracks A2 and B4
Charity and Linda McCrary – backing vocals on "Strengthen My Love"
Cornelius Bumpus – saxophone on "Strengthen My Love"
Bill Payne – synthesizer on tracks A3 and A4
Nick DeCaro – strings on tracks A3 to A5 and B5
Bill Martin – backing vocals on tracks A3, B2, and B3
Maureen MacDonald – backing vocals on "Here in the Light"
Norton Buffalo – harmonica on tracks A5 and B1
Michael Porcaro – bass on "Don't Kid Yourself"
Jim Petteway – guitar on tracks B1 and B2
Trey Thompson – bass on tracks B1 and B2
Michael Hossack – drums on tracks B1 and B2
John McFee – steel guitar on tracks B2 and B3, and acoustic guitar on "Looking for Love"
Brian Mann – accordion on "Forgetting You"

Production
Michael McDonald - producer

References

External links

1980 debut albums
Amy Holland albums
Capitol Records albums